Tian Houwei (born 11 January 1992) is a badminton player from China. He was the 2009 World and Asian Junior Champions in the boys' singles event. Tian was part of the Chinese national team that won the silver medals at the 2013 Summer Universiade and 2014 Asian Games.

Achievements

Asian Championships 
Men's singles

BWF World Junior Championships 
Boys' singles

Asian Junior Championships 
Boys' singles

BWF Superseries 
The BWF Superseries, launched on 14 December 2006 and implemented in 2007, is a series of elite badminton tournaments, sanctioned by Badminton World Federation (BWF). BWF Superseries has two level such as Superseries and Superseries Premier. A season of Superseries features twelve tournaments around the world, which introduced since 2011, with successful players invited to the Superseries Finals held at the year end.

Men's singles

  BWF Superseries Finals tournament
  BWF Superseries Premier tournament
  BWF Superseries tournament

BWF Grand Prix 
The BWF Grand Prix had two levels, the BWF Grand Prix and Grand Prix Gold. It was a series of badminton tournaments sanctioned by the Badminton World Federation (BWF) which was held from 2007 to 2017.

Men's singles

  BWF Grand Prix Gold tournament
  BWF Grand Prix tournament

References

External links 
 

1992 births
Living people
Badminton players from Fujian
Sportspeople from Fuzhou
Chinese male badminton players
Badminton players at the 2014 Asian Games
Asian Games silver medalists for China
Asian Games medalists in badminton
Medalists at the 2014 Asian Games
Universiade silver medalists for China
Universiade medalists in badminton
Medalists at the 2013 Summer Universiade
21st-century Chinese people